In differential topology, the transversality theorem, also known as the Thom transversality theorem after French mathematician René Thom, is a major result that describes the transverse intersection properties of a smooth family of smooth maps. It says that transversality is a generic property: any smooth map , may be deformed by an arbitrary small amount into a map that is transverse to a given submanifold . Together with the Pontryagin–Thom construction, it is the technical heart of cobordism theory, and the starting point for surgery theory. The finite-dimensional version of the transversality theorem is also a very useful tool for establishing the genericity of a property which is dependent on a finite number of real parameters and which is expressible using a system of nonlinear equations. This can be extended to an infinite-dimensional parametrization using the infinite-dimensional version of the transversality theorem.

Finite-dimensional version

Previous definitions 

 .

 .

Parametric transversality theorem 

Consider the map  and define . This generates a family of mappings .

The statement of the parametric transversality theorem is:

Suppose that  is a smooth map of manifolds, where only  has boundary, and let  be any submanifold of  without boundary.

More general transversality theorems 

The parametric transversality theorem above is sufficient for many elementary applications (see the book by Guillemin and Pollack).

There are more powerful statements (collectively known as transversality theorems) that imply the parametric transversality theorem and are needed for more advanced applications.

Informally, the "transversality theorem" states that the set of mappings that are transverse to a given submanifold is a dense open (or, in some cases, only a dense ) subset of the set of mappings. To make such a statement precise, it is necessary to define the space of mappings under consideration, and what is the topology in it. There are several possibilities; see the book by Hirsch.

What is usually understood by Thom's transversality theorem is a more powerful statement about jet transversality. See the books by Hirsch and by Golubitsky and Guillemin. The original reference is Thom, Bol. Soc. Mat. Mexicana (2) 1 (1956), pp. 59–71.

John Mather proved in the 1970s an even more general result called the multijet transversality theorem. See the book by Golubitsky and Guillemin.

Infinite-dimensional version 
The infinite-dimensional version of the transversality theorem takes into account that the manifolds may be modeled in Banach spaces.

Formal statement 

Suppose  is a  map of -Banach manifolds. Assume:

(ii) The -map  with  has  as a regular value.

(iii) For each parameter , the map  is a Fredholm map, where  for every 

Note that if  for all the solutions of  then there exists an open dense subset  of  such that there are at most finitely many solutions for each fixed parameter  In addition, all these solutions are regular.

References

Theorems in differential topology
Differential geometry